Atlantis: The Lost Empire is a 2001 American animated science fiction adventure film produced by Walt Disney Feature Animation and released by Walt Disney Pictures. The 41st film produced by the studio, it was directed by Gary Trousdale and Kirk Wise and produced by Don Hahn from a screenplay by Tab Murphy. The film features an ensemble voice cast that includes Michael J. Fox, Cree Summer, James Garner, Leonard Nimoy, Don Novello, Phil Morris, Claudia Christian, Jacqueline Obradors, Jim Varney (in his final film role), Florence Stanley, John Mahoney, David Ogden Stiers and Corey Burton. Set in 1914, the film tells the story of young linguist Milo Thatch, who gains possession of a sacred book, which he believes will guide him and a crew of mercenaries to the lost city of Atlantis.

Development of the film began after production had finished on The Hunchback of Notre Dame (1996). Instead of another musical, directors Trousdale and Wise, producer Hahn, and screenwriter Murphy decided to do an adventure film inspired by the works of Jules Verne. Atlantis: The Lost Empire was notable for adopting the distinctive visual style of comic book artist Mike Mignola, one of the film's production designers. The film made greater use of computer-generated imagery (CGI) than any of Disney's previous traditionally animated features and remains one of the few to have been shot in anamorphic format. Linguist Marc Okrand constructed an Atlantean language specifically for use in the film. James Newton Howard provided the film's musical score. The film was released at a time when audience interest in animated films was shifting away from hand-drawn animation toward films with full CGI.

Atlantis: The Lost Empire premiered at the El Capitan Theatre in Los Angeles on June 3, 2001 and went into its general release on June 15. The film received mixed reviews from critics. As a result of the film's underperformance, Disney quietly cancelled a planned spin-off animated television series Team Atlantis, an underwater Disneyland attraction, and a volcanic Magic Kingdom attraction based on it. Atlantis was nominated for a number of awards, including seven Annie Awards, and won Best Sound Editing at the 2002 Golden Reel Awards. The film was released on VHS and DVD on January 29, 2002, and on Blu-ray on June 11, 2013. Despite its initial reception, re-evaluation in later years has resulted in Atlantis gaining a cult following and reappraisal from critics as a mistreated classic, due in part to Mignola's unique artistic influence. A direct-to-video sequel, Atlantis: Milo's Return, was released in 2003.

Plot

In 6,800 BC, an explosion sent a tsunami towards the city of Atlantis. The Queen left Princess Kida behind and was lifted up into a floating crystal, which merged with the Queen and created a protective dome over the city's innermost district, which sank beneath the waves.

8,714 years later, in 1914, Milo Thatch, a Smithsonian Institution linguist who is ridiculed for his dream of finding Atlantis, is introduced by Helga Sinclair to eccentric millionaire Preston B. Whitmore, an old friend of Milo's grandfather. Whitmore reveals that he made a bet with Milo's grandfather to fund an expedition to Atlantis and gives Milo the Shepherd's Journal, a book describing the history and path to Atlantis, offering him a place in the expedition. The expedition is headed by Commander Rourke and includes Helga; demolitions expert Vinny; geologist Molière; medical officer Dr. Sweet; mechanic Audrey; radio operator Mrs. Packard; chef Cookie; and dozens of soldiers. Their submarine the Ulysses is attacked and destroyed by a mechanical leviathan guarding the entrance to Atlantis, leaving only a handful of survivors. Following the journal, they travel through a dormant volcano and eventually arrive at Atlantis, where they are met by the still young Princess Kida.

Against her father's wishes, Kida enlists Milo to help Atlantis regain its glory, as its culture and knowledge have been decaying for centuries. Milo learns that a huge crystal, the Heart of Atlantis, gives the people longevity, and once powered their devices via smaller crystals they all wear. He also discovers that Rourke and the rest of the crew have known all along of the crystal and used the expedition as part of Rourke's evil plan to steal it and destroy Atlantis. Rourke fatally punches the king when he refuses to give up the location of the crystal but discovers the crystal's chamber regardless. Sensing the threat, the crystal merges with Kida. Rourke imprisons her in a crate, whereupon Milo convinces the crew to turn on Rourke, unwilling to be party to an innocent people's extinction. Rourke, Helga, and the soldiers start for the surface with Kida and destroy the bridge to trap the others behind. The dying King gives Milo his own crystal, explaining that he had tried to weaponize the Heart which caused the prior explosion and the fate of his wife. He says the crystal selects a royal host when the city is in danger, and begs Milo to save Atlantis and Kida, who will be lost to the crystal forever if not separated from it in time.

Milo and his friends rally the Atlanteans to reactivate their flying machines and pursue the mercenaries. They quickly defeat Rourke's men, but he and Helga nearly escape with Kida. Rourke betrays Helga and throws her to her death. As she dies, she shoots the airship containing Kida's crate while Rourke and Milo fight, with the bullet damaging the airship. While the airship over the Heart burns, Milo slashes Rourke with a crystal-charged shard of glass, turning Rourke into a crystal monster before being shattered by the airship's propellers, killing him in the process. The airship awakens the volcano as it crash-lands. Milo and the rest flee back to Atlantis with Kida, who, still merged with the crystal, rises into the sky and awakens ancient Stone Guardians, who rise from the flooded portion of Atlantis, creating a dome to protect it from the lava flow. Once the danger is neutralized, the Crystal returns Kida, alive, to Milo. 

Milo, as a reward for saving Atlantis from Rourke and Helga, elects to stay in Atlantis with Kida, with whom he has fallen in love, and the rest return to the surface, each with their own Atlantean crystals and a portion of treasure. During the film's epilogue, Whitmore reviews photographs of the adventure taken by Mrs. Packard, but makes the others swear to secrecy to preserve Atlantis's safety. In the stack of photos, Whitmore also finds a note from Milo and an Atlantean crystal.

Voice cast

 Michael J. Fox as Milo James Thatch, a linguist and cartographer at the Smithsonian who was recruited to decipher The Shepherd's Journal while directing an expedition to Atlantis. Kirk Wise, one of the directors, said that they chose Fox for the role because they felt he gave his characters his own personality and made them more believable on screen. Fox said that voice acting was much easier than his past experience with live action because he did not have to worry about what he looked like in front of a camera while delivering his lines. The directors mentioned that Fox was also offered a role for Titan A.E.; he allowed his son to choose which film he would work on, and he chose Atlantis. Viewers have noted similarities between Milo and the film's language consultant, Marc Okrand, who developed the Atlantean language used in the film. Okrand stated that Milo's supervising animator, John Pomeroy, sketched him, claiming not to know how a linguist looked or acted.
 James Garner as Commander Lyle Tiberius Rourke, the leader of the band of mercenaries, for the Atlantean expedition. Wise chose Garner because of his previous experience with action films, especially war and Western films and said the role "fits him like a glove". When asked if he would be interested in the role, Garner replied: "I'd do it in a heartbeat."
 Cree Summer as Kidagakash "Kida" Nedakh, the Princess of Atlantis and Milo's love interest. Kida's supervising animator, Randy Haycock, stated that Summer was very "intimidating" when he first met her; this influenced how he wanted Kida to look and act on screen when she meets Milo. 
 Natalie Strom provided dialogue for Kida as a young child.
 Summer also voiced the unnamed Queen of Atlantis, Kida's mother and Kashekim's wife who was "chosen" by the Crystal during the sinking of the city.
 Don Novello as Vincenzo "Vinny" Santorini, an Italian demolitions expert. Kirk Wise and Russ Edmonds, Vinny's supervising animator, noted Novello's unique ability to improvise dialogue. Edmonds recalled, "[Novello] would look at the sheet, and he would read the line that was written once, and he would never read it again! And we never used a written line, it was improvs, the whole movie."
 Phil Morris as Dr. Joshua Strongbear Sweet, a medic of African American and Native American descent. Sweet's supervising animator, Ron Husband, indicated that one of the challenges was animating Sweet in sync with Morris' rapid line delivery while keeping him believable. Morris stated that this character was extreme, with "no middle ground"; he mentioned, "When he was happy, he was really happy, and when he's solemn, he's real solemn."
 Claudia Christian as Lieutenant Helga Katrina Sinclair, Rourke's German second-in-command and lieutenant. Christian described her character as "sensual" and "striking". She was relieved when she finally saw what her character looked like, joking, "I'd hate to, you know, go through all this and find out my character is a toad."
 Jacqueline Obradors as Audrey Rocio Ramirez, a teenage Puerto Rican mechanic and the youngest member of the expedition. Obradors said her character made her "feel like a little kid again" and she always hoped her sessions would last longer.
 Florence Stanley as Wilhelmina Bertha Packard: an elderly, sarcastic, chain-smoking radio operator. Stanley felt that Packard was very "cynical" and "secure": "She does her job and when she is not busy she does anything she wants."
 David Ogden Stiers as Fenton Q. Harcourt, a board member of the Smithsonian Institution who dismisses Milo's belief in the existence of Atlantis. Stiers previously worked with Michael J. Fox in Doc Hollywood. He earlier voice-acted for Disney in Beauty and the Beast as Cogsworth, Pocahontas as Governor Ratcliffe and Wiggins, and The Hunchback of Notre Dame as the Archdeacon and would do so again in Lilo & Stitch as Jumba.
 John Mahoney as Preston B. Whitmore, an eccentric millionaire who funds the expedition to Atlantis. Lloyd Bridges was originally cast and recorded as Whitmore, but he died before completing the film. Mahoney's zest and vigor led to Whitmore's personality being reworked for the film. Mahoney stated that doing voice work was "freeing" and allowed him to be "big" and "outrageous" with his character.
 Jim Varney as Jebidiah Allardyce "Cookie" Farnsworth, a Western-style chuckwagon chef. Varney died of lung cancer in February 2000, before the production ended, and the film was dedicated to his memory. Producer Don Hahn was saddened that Varney never saw the finished film, but mentioned that he was shown clips of his character's performance during his site sessions and said, "He loved it." Shawn Keller, supervising animator for Cookie, stated, "It was kind of a sad fact that [Varney] knew that he was not going to be able to see this film before he passed away. He did a bang-up job doing the voice work, knowing the fact that he was never gonna see his last performance." Steven Barr recorded supplemental dialogue for Cookie.
 Corey Burton as Gaetan "Mole" Molière, a French geologist who acts like a mole. Burton mentioned that finding his performance as Mole was by allowing the character to "leap out" of him while making funny voices. To get into character during his recording sessions, he stated that he would "throw myself into the scene and feel like I'm in this make-believe world".
 Leonard Nimoy as Kashekim Nedakh, the King of Atlantis and Kida's father. Michael Cedeno, supervising animator for King Nedakh, was astounded at Nimoy's voice talent, stating that he had "so much rich character" in his performance. As he spoke his lines, Cedeno said the crew would sit there and watch Nimoy in astonishment.

Production

Development

The idea for Atlantis: The Lost Empire was conceived in October 1996 when Don Hahn, Gary Trousdale, Kirk Wise, and Tab Murphy lunched at a Mexican restaurant in Burbank, California. Having recently completed The Hunchback of Notre Dame the producer and directors wanted to keep the Hunchback crew together for another film with an Adventureland setting rather than a Fantasyland setting. Drawing inspiration from Jules Verne's Twenty Thousand Leagues Under the Seas (1870), they set out to make a film which would fully explore Atlantis (compared to the brief visit depicted in Verne's novel). While primarily utilizing the Internet to research the mythology of Atlantis, the filmmakers became interested in the clairvoyant readings of Edgar Cayce and decided to incorporate some of his ideas—notably that of a mother-crystal which provides power, healing, and longevity to the Atlanteans—into the story. They also visited museums and old army installations to study the technology of the early 20th century (the film's time period), and traveled underground in New Mexico's Carlsbad Caverns to view the subterranean trails which would serve as a model for the approach to Atlantis in the film.

The filmmakers wanted to avoid the common depiction of Atlantis as "crumbled Greek columns underwater", said Wise. "From the get-go, we were committed to designing it top to bottom. Let's get the architectural style, clothing, heritage, customs, how they would sleep, and how they would speak. So we brought people on board who would help us develop those ideas." Art director David Goetz stated, "We looked at Mayan architecture, styles of ancient, unusual architecture from around the world, and the directors really liked the look of Southeast Asian architecture." The team later took ideas from other architectural forms, including Cambodian, Indian, and Tibetan works. Hahn added, "If you take and deconstruct architecture from around the world into one architectural vocabulary, that's what our Atlantis looks like." The overall design and circular layout of Atlantis were also based on the writings of Plato, and his quote "in a single day and night of misfortune, the island of Atlantis disappeared into the depths of the sea" was influential from the beginning of production. The crew wore T-shirts which read "ATLANTIS—Fewer songs, more explosions" due to the film's plan as an action-adventure (unlike previous Disney animated features, which were musicals).

Dean DeBlois, who worked as co-head of story for Mulan, originally joined the project. However, DeBlois grew unsatisfied with his work on Atlantis and realized that he wanted to work with his friend Chris Sanders as co-writer and director on the studio's next film Lilo & Stitch. He spoke with Thomas Schumacher, then-president of Walt Disney Feature Animation, about this and Schumacher allowed him to leave Atlantis to work on Lilo and Stitch.

Language 

Marc Okrand, who developed the Klingon language for the Star Trek television and theatrical productions, was hired to devise the Atlantean language for Atlantis: The Lost Empire. Guided by the directors' initial concept for it to be a "mother-language", Okrand employed an Indo-European word stock with its own grammatical structure. He would change the words if they began to sound too much like an actual, spoken language. John Emerson designed the written component, making hundreds of random sketches of individual letters from among which the directors chose the best to represent the Atlantean alphabet. The written language was boustrophedon: designed to be read left-to-right on the first line, then right-to-left on the second, continuing in a zigzag pattern to simulate the flow of water.

Writing
Joss Whedon was the first writer to be involved with the film but soon left to work on other Disney projects. According to him, he "had not a shred" in the movie. Tab Murphy completed the screenplay, stating that the time from initially discussing the story to producing a script that satisfied the film crew was "about three to four months". The initial draft was 155 pages, much longer than a typical Disney film script (which usually runs 90 pages). When the first two acts were timed at 120 minutes, the directors cut characters and sequences and focused more on Milo. Murphy said that he created the centuries-old Shepherd's Journal because he needed a map for the characters to follow throughout their journey. A revised version of the script eliminated the trials encountered by the explorers as they navigated the caves to Atlantis. This gave the film a faster pace because Atlantis is discovered earlier in the story.

The character of Milo J. Thatch was originally supposed to be a descendant of Edward Teach, otherwise known as Blackbeard the pirate. The directors later related him to an explorer so he would discover his inner talent for exploration. The character of Molière was originally intended to be "professorial" but Chris Ure, a story artist, changed the concept to that of a "horrible little burrowing creature with a wacky coat and strange headgear with extending eyeballs", said Wise. Don Hahn pointed out that the absence of songs presented a challenge for a team accustomed to animating musicals, as action scenes alone would have to carry the film. Kirk Wise said it gave the team an opportunity for more on-screen character development: "We had more screen time available to do a scene like where Milo and the explorers are camping out and learning about one another's histories. An entire sequence is devoted to having dinner and going to bed. That is not typically something we would have the luxury of doing."

Hahn stated that the first animated sequence completed during production was the film's prologue. The original version featured a Viking war party using The Shepherd's Journal to find Atlantis and being swiftly dispatched by the Leviathan. Near the end of production, story supervisor John Sanford told the directors that he felt this prologue did not give viewers enough emotional involvement with the Atlanteans. Despite knowing that the Viking prologue was finished and it would cost additional time and money to alter the scene, the directors agreed with Sanford. Trousdale went home and completed the storyboards later that evening after visiting a strip club where he boarded the new sequence on a napkin. The opening was replaced by a sequence depicting the destruction of Atlantis, which introduced the film from the perspective of the Atlanteans and Princess Kida. The Viking prologue is included as an extra feature on the DVD release.

Animation

At the peak of its production, 350 animators, artists and technicians were working on Atlantis at all three Disney animation studios: Walt Disney Feature Animation (Burbank, California), Disney Feature Animation Florida (Orlando), and Disney Animation France (Paris). The film was one of the few Disney animated features produced and shot in 35mm anamorphic format. The directors felt that a widescreen image was crucial, as a nostalgic reference to old action-adventure films presented in the CinemaScope format (2.39:1), noting Raiders of the Lost Ark as an inspiration. Because switching to the format would require animation desks and equipment designed for widescreen to be purchased, Disney executives were at first reluctant about the idea.  The production team found a simple solution by drawing within a smaller frame on the same paper and equipment used for standard aspect ratio (1.66:1) Disney-animated films. Layout supervisor Ed Ghertner wrote a guide to the widescreen format for use by the layout artists and mentioned that one advantage of widescreen was that he could keep characters in scenes longer because of additional space to walk within the frame. Wise drew further inspiration for the format from filmmakers David Lean and Akira Kurosawa.

The film's visual style was strongly based upon that of Mike Mignola, the comic book artist behind Hellboy. Mignola was one of four production designers (along with Matt Codd, Jim Martin, and Ricardo Delgado) hired by the Disney studio for the film. Accordingly, he provided style guides, preliminary character, and background designs, and story ideas. "Mignola's graphic, the angular style was a key influence on the 'look' of the characters," stated Wise. Mignola was surprised when first contacted by the studio to work on Atlantis. His artistic influence on the film would later contribute to a cult following.

The final pull-out scene of the movie, immediately before the end-title card, was described by the directors as the most difficult scene in the history of Disney animation. They said that the pullout attempt on their prior film, The Hunchback of Notre Dame, "struggled" and "lacked depth"; however, after making advances in the process of multiplaning, they tried the technique again in Atlantis. The scene begins with one  piece of paper showing a close-up of Milo and Kida. As the camera pulls away from them to reveal the newly restored Atlantis, it reaches the equivalent of an  piece of paper composed of many individual pieces of paper ( or smaller). Each piece was carefully drawn and combined with animated vehicles simultaneously flying across the scene to make the viewer see a complete, integrated image.

At the time of its release, Atlantis: The Lost Empire was notable for using more computer-generated imagery (CGI) than any other Disney traditionally animated feature. To increase productivity, the directors had the digital artists work with the traditional animators throughout the production. Several important scenes required heavy use of digital animation: the Leviathan, the Ulysses submarine and sub-pods, the Heart of Atlantis, and the Stone Giants. During production, after Matt Codd and Jim Martin designed the Ulysses on paper, Greg Aronowitz was hired to build a scale model of the submarine, to be used as a reference for drawing the 3D Ulysses. The final film included 362 digital-effects shots, and computer programs were used to seamlessly join the 2D and 3D artwork. One scene that took advantage of this was the "sub-drop" scene, where the 3D Ulysses was dropped from its docking bay into the water. As the camera floated toward it, a 2D Milo was drawn to appear inside, tracking the camera. The crew noted that it was challenging to keep the audience from noticing the difference between the 2D and 3D drawings when they were merged. The digital production also gave the directors a unique "virtual camera" for complicated shots within the film. With the ability to operate in the z-plane, this camera moved through a digital wire-frame set; the background and details were later hand-drawn over the wireframes. This was used in the opening flight scene through Atlantis and the submarine chase through the undersea cavern with the Leviathan in pursuit.

Music and sound
Since the film would not feature any songs, the directors hired James Newton Howard to compose the score after the directors heard his music on Dinosaur. Approaching it as a live-action film, Howard decided to have different musical themes for the cultures of the surface world and Atlantis. In the case of Atlantis, Howard chose an Indonesian orchestral sound incorporating chimes, bells, and gongs. The directors told Howard that the film would have a number of key scenes without dialogue; the score would need to convey emotionally what the viewer was seeing on screen.

Gary Rydstrom and his team at Skywalker Sound were hired for the film's sound production. Like Howard, Rydstrom employed different sounds for the two cultures. Focusing on the machine and mechanical sounds of the early industrial era for the explorers, he felt that the Atlanteans should have a "more organic" sound utilizing ceramics and pottery. The sound made by the Atlantean flying-fish vehicles posed a particular challenge. Rydstrom revealed that he was sitting at the side of a highway recording one day when a semi-truck drove by at high speed. When the recording was sped up on his computer, he felt it sounded very organic, and decided to use it in the film. Rydstrom created the harmonic chiming of the Heart of Atlantis by rubbing his finger along the edge of a champagne flute, and the sound of sub-pods moving through the water with a water pick.

Release
Atlantis: The Lost Empire had its world premiere at Disney's El Capitan Theatre in Hollywood, California on June 3, 2001 and a limited release in New York City and Los Angeles on June 8; a wider release followed on June 15. At the premiere, Destination: Atlantis was on display, featuring behind-the-scenes props from the film and information on the legend of Atlantis with video games, displays, laser tag, and other attractions. The Aquarium of the Pacific also loaned a variety of fish for display within the attraction.

Promotion
Atlantis was among Disney's first major attempts to utilize internet marketing. The film was promoted through Kellogg's, which created a website with mini-games and a movie-based video game give-away for UPC labels from specially marked packages of Atlantis breakfast cereal. The film was one of Disney's first marketing attempts through mobile network operators, and allowed users to download games based on the film. McDonald's (which had an exclusive licensing agreement on all Disney releases) promoted the film with Happy Meal toys, food packaging and in-store decor. The McDonald's advertising campaign involved television, radio, and print advertisements beginning on the film's release date. Frito-Lay offered free admission tickets for the film on specially marked snack packages.

Home media 
Atlantis: The Lost Empire was released on VHS and DVD January 29, 2002. During the first month of its home release, the film led in VHS sales and was third in VHS and DVD sales combined. Sales and rentals of the VHS and DVD combined would eventually accumulate $157 million in revenue by mid-2003. Both a single-disc DVD edition and a two-disc collector's edition (with bonus features) were released. The single-disc DVD gave the viewer the option of viewing the film either in its original theatrical 2.39:1 aspect ratio or a modified 1.33:1 ratio (utilizing pan and scan). Bonus features available on the DVD version included audio and visual commentary from the film team, a virtual tour of the CGI models, an Atlantean-language tutorial, an encyclopedia on the myth of Atlantis, and the deleted Viking prologue scene. The two-disc collector's edition DVD contained all the single-disc features and a disc with supplemental material detailing all aspects of the film's production. The collector's-edition film could only be viewed in its original theatrical ratio, and also featured an optional DTS 5.1 track. Both DVD versions, however, contained a Dolby Digital 5.1 track and were THX certified. Disney digitally remastered and released Atlantis on Blu-ray on June 11, 2013, bundled with its sequel Atlantis: Milo's Return.

Reception

Box office
Before the film's release, reporters speculated that it would have a difficult run due to competition from Shrek and Lara Croft: Tomb Raider. Regarding the market's shift from traditional animation and competition with CGI films, Kirk Wise said, "Any traditional animator, including myself, can't help but feel a twinge. I think it always comes down to story and character, and one form won't replace the other. Just like photography didn't replace painting. But maybe I'm blind to it." Jeff Jensen of Entertainment Weekly noted that CGI films (such as Shrek) were more likely to attract the teenage demographic typically not interested in animation, and called Atlantis a "marketing and creative gamble".

With a budget of $100 million, the film opened at #2 on its debut weekend, behind Lara Croft: Tomb Raider earning $20.3 million in 3,011 theaters. During its second weekend, it would drop into fourth place behind the latter film, Dr. Dolittle 2 and The Fast and the Furious, making $13.2 million. The film's international release began September 20 in Australia and other markets followed suit. During its 25-week theatrical run, Atlantis: The Lost Empire grossed over $186 million worldwide ($84 million from the United States and Canada). Responding to its disappointing box-office performance, Thomas Schumacher, then-president of Walt Disney Feature Animation, said, "It seemed like a good idea at the time to not do a sweet fairy tale, but we missed."

Critical response
The site's consensus is: "Atlantis provides a fast-paced spectacle, but stints on such things as character development and a coherent plot". Metacritic assigned the film a weighted average score of 52 out of 100 based on 29 reviews from mainstream critics; this was considered "mixed or average reviews". Audiences polled by CinemaScore gave the film an average grade of "A" on an A+ to F scale.

While critics had mixed reactions to the film in general, some praised it for its visuals, action-adventure elements, and attempt to appeal to an older audience. Roger Ebert gave Atlantis three-and-a-half stars out of four. He praised the animation's "clean bright visual look" and the "classic energy of the comic book style", crediting this to the work of Mike Mignola. Ebert gave particular praise to the story and the final battle scene and wrote, "The story of Atlantis is rousing in an old pulp science fiction sort of way, but the climactic scene transcends the rest, and stands by itself as one of the great animated action sequences." In The New York Times, Elvis Mitchell gave high praise to the film, calling it "a monumental treat", and stated, "Atlantis is also one of the most eye-catching Disney cartoons since Uncle Walt institutionalized the four-fingered glove." Internet film critic James Berardinelli wrote a positive review of the film, giving it three out of four stars. He wrote, "On the whole, Atlantis offers 90 minutes of solid entertainment, once again proving that while Disney may be clueless when it comes to producing good live-action movies, they are exactly the opposite when it comes to their animated division." Wesley Morris of the San Francisco Chronicle wrote positively of the film's approach for an older audience: "But just beneath the surface, Atlantis brims with adult possibility."

Other critics felt that the film was mediocre in regards to its story and characters, and that it failed to deliver as a non-musical to Disney's traditional audience. Owen Gleiberman of Entertainment Weekly gave the film a C+ rating, writing that the film had "gee-whiz formulaic character" and was "the essence of craft without dream". Kenneth Turan of the Los Angeles Times said the storyline and characterizations were "old-fashioned" and the film had the retrograde look of a Saturday-morning cartoon, but these deficiencies were offset by its "brisk action" and frantic pace. Todd McCarthy of Variety wrote, "Disney pushes into all-talking, no-singing, no-dancing and, in the end, no-fun animated territory." Stephanie Zacharek of Salon wrote of Disney's attempt to make the film for an adult audience, "The big problem with Disney's latest animated feature, Atlantis: The Lost Empire, is that it doesn't seem geared to kids at all: It's so adult that it's massively boring." Rita Kempley of The Washington Post panned the film, calling it a "new-fashioned but old-fangled hash" and wrote, "Ironically Disney had hoped to update its image with this mildly diverting adventure, yet the picture hasn't really broken away from the tried-and-true format spoofed in the far superior Shrek."

In 2015, Katharine Trendacosta at io9 reviewed the film and called it a "Beautiful Gem of a Movie That Deserved Better Than It Got" and said that the film deserves more love than it ended up getting. Lindsay Teal considers "Atlantis" to be "a lost Disney classic". Describing the film as highly entertaining, she praises the writing and characterisation – in particular, Sweet, Helga and Kida. In particular, much praise has been given to the character of Kida. Summer has regarded the character of Kida as one of her favourite roles and even considers the character among the official Disney Princess line-up.

Themes and interpretations
Several critics and scholars have noted that Atlantis plays strongly on themes of anti-capitalism and anti-imperialism. M. Keith Booker, academic and author of studies about the implicit messages conveyed by media, views the character of Rourke as being motivated by "capitalist greed" when he pursues "his own financial gain" in spite of the knowledge that "his theft [of the crystal] will lead to the destruction of [Atlantis]". Religion journalist Mark Pinsky, in his exploration of moral and spiritual themes in popular Disney films, says that "it is impossible to read the movie ... any other way" than as "a devastating, unrelenting attack on capitalism and American imperialism". Max Messier of FilmCritic.com observes, "Disney even manages to lambast the capitalist lifestyle of the adventurers intent on uncovering the lost city. Damn the imperialists!" According to Booker, the film also "delivers a rather segregationist moral" by concluding with the discovery of the Atlanteans kept secret from other surface-dwellers in order to maintain a separation between the two highly divergent cultures. Others saw Atlantis as an interesting look at utopian philosophy of the sort found in classic works of science fiction by H. G. Wells and Jules Verne.

Nadia: The Secret of Blue Water controversy
When the film was released, some viewers noticed that Atlantis: The Lost Empire was similar to the anime Nadia: The Secret of Blue Water, particularly in its character design, setting, and story. The similarities, as noted by viewers in both Japan and America, were strong enough for its production company Gainax to be called to sue for plagiarism. According to Gainax member Yasuhiro Takeda, they only refrained from doing so because the decision belonged to parent companies NHK and Toho. Another Gainax worker, Hiroyuki Yamaga, was quoted in an interview in 2000 as saying: "We actually tried to get NHK to pick a fight with Disney, but even the National Television Network of Japan didn't dare to mess with Disney and their lawyers. [...] We actually did say that but we wouldn't actually take them to court. We would be so terrified about what they would do to them in return that we wouldn't dare."

Although Disney never responded formally to those claims, co-director Kirk Wise posted on a Disney animation newsgroup in May 2001, "Never heard of Nadia till it was mentioned in this [newsgroup]. Long after we'd finished production, I might add." He claimed both Atlantis and Nadia were inspired, in part, by the 1870 Jules Verne novel Twenty Thousand Leagues Under the Sea. However, speaking about the clarification, Lee Zion from Anime News Network wrote, "There are too many similarities not connected with 20,000 Leagues for the whole thing to be coincidence." As such, the whole affair ultimately entered popular culture as a convincing case of plagiarism. In 2018, Reuben Baron from Comic Book Resources added to Zion's comment stating, "Verne didn't specifically imagine magic crystal-based technology, something featured in both the Disney movie and the two similar anime. The Verne inspiration also doesn't explain the designs being suspiciously similar to Nadia'''s."

Critics also saw parallels with the 1986 film Laputa: Castle in the Sky from Hayao Miyazaki and Studio Ghibli (which also featured magic crystals, and Atlantis directors Trousdale and Wise both acknowledged Miyazaki's works as a major influence on their own work) and with the 1994 film Stargate as Milo's characteristics were said to resemble those of Daniel Jackson, the protagonist of Stargate and its spinoff television series Stargate SG-1—which coincidentally launched its own spinoff, titled Stargate Atlantis.

Accolades 

Related worksAtlantis: The Lost Empire was meant to inspire an animated television series entitled Team Atlantis, which would have presented the further adventures of its characters. The series would have been akin to an animated steampunk version of The X-Files and feature a crossover with Gargoyles. However, because of the film's underperformance at the box office, the series was not produced. On May 20, 2003, Disney released a direct-to-video sequel titled Atlantis: Milo's Return, consisting of three episodes planned for the aborted series.

Disneyland planned to revive its Submarine Voyage ride with an Atlantis: The Lost Empire theme with elements from the movie. These plans were canceled and the attraction was re-opened in 2007 as the Finding Nemo Submarine Voyage, its theme based on the 2003 Pixar film Finding Nemo, which was far more successful commercially and critically. In addition, after the Submarine Voyage's Magic Kingdom counterpart, 20,000 Leagues Under the Sea: Submarine Voyage, closed down in 1994, four years before Disneyland's, there were proposals of a new attraction that would take its place, with one of them a volcano attraction inspired by that film's Vulcania location, being approved for the Magic Kingdom's Adventureland area. Around 1999, during development of Atlantis: The Lost Empire, it was decided that it would be themed to the movie, with it taking place in 1916, two years after the film's events. The ride would have focused on Preston Whitmore, a character from the film, seeking to make Atlantis existence public and offer expeditions to visitors in newly developed vehicles. However, due to mishaps, the vehicles would be forced to make a detour through the lava-filled caverns of the volcano. The attraction would have used a unique hybrid ride system, in which it would start as a standard coaster before the trains hook up to a suspended track midway through to fly through the caverns. The attraction would have been accessed by a new canyon path in between Pirates of the Caribbean and a re-routed Jungle Cruise that would have led to a Whitmore Enterprises base camp at the edge of the Walt Disney World Railroad path, with the mountain itself being built outside the berm. However, like the previous Submarine Voyage retheme, the ride was cancelled due to the film's disappointment in the box office.

Soundtrack

The soundtrack to Atlantis: The Lost Empire was released on May 22, 2001. It consists primarily of James Newton Howard's score and includes "Where the Dream Takes You", written by Howard and Diane Warren and performed by Mýa. It was also available in a limited edition of 20,000 numbered copies with a unique 3D album cover insert depicting the Leviathan from the film. A rare promotional edition (featuring 73 minutes of material, compared to the 53 minutes on standard commercial editions) was intended only for Academy of Motion Picture Arts and Sciences voters but was bootlegged and distributed with fan-created artwork.

Video games
There are several video games based on the film. Atlantis: The Lost Empire – Search for the Journal was developed by Zombie Studios and published by Disney Interactive. It was released for Microsoft Windows. Atlantis: The Lost Empire – Trial by Fire was developed by Zombie Studios and published by Disney Interactive. It was released for Microsoft Windows.Atlantis: The Lost Empire is an action-adventure game developed by Eurocom Entertainment Software and published by Sony Computer Entertainment for the PlayStation console. The player controls Milo, Audrey, Molière, Kida, and Vinny as they traverse Atlantis, unlocking its secrets. Some features in the game unlock others (such as a movie) by finding items hidden throughout the game. THQ released Atlantis: The Lost Empire for the Game Boy Advance and Game Boy Color. On Game Boy Color, it is a platform game developed by Eurocom Entertainment Software in which the player controls Milo, Audrey, Molière, and Vinny on a quest to discover Atlantis. On Game Boy Advance, it is a platform game developed by 3d6 Games that hinges on searching and collecting crystals.

Legacy
On June 15, 2021, Disney posted on Twitter: "20 years ago today, Milo Thatch journeyed to Atlantis.  Happy anniversary to this epic 2001 adventure!" A limited commemorative pin was also released by the company for the anniversary. Cast and crew of the movie also celebrated its anniversary by doing a 5-hour livestream through several platforms in an event organized by fans of the film, which was planned the year before in advance.

See also
 Atlantis in popular culture
 20,000 Leagues Under the Sea Indiana Jones
 Kimba the White Lion and The Lion King controversy, a similar plagiarism controversy
 The Road to El Dorado'', another animated film which has gained a cult following

Notes

References

Bibliography

Books

DVD media

Periodicals

External links

 
 The first draft of the script by Tab Murphy
 

 
 
 
 
 

 
2001 films
2001 animated films
2000s American animated films
2000s English-language films
Atlantis in fiction
Fictional-language films
Films set in 1914
Films set in the 1910s
Films set in Atlantis
Films set in the Atlantic Ocean
Films set in Washington, D.C.
Walt Disney Animation Studios films
Walt Disney Pictures animated films
Films directed by Kirk Wise
Films directed by Gary Trousdale
Films produced by Don Hahn
Films scored by James Newton Howard
Films with screenplays by Tab Murphy
Films with screenplays by Gary Trousdale
Films with screenplays by Joss Whedon
Films involved in plagiarism controversies
Disney controversies
Film controversies
Steampunk films
Films about father–daughter relationships
Films about princesses